La Unión (sometimes styled as La Uniøn) was a Spanish new wave band formed in 1982 by Rafa Sánchez, Mario Martínez, Luis Bolín, and Íñigo Zabala. They are best known for their 1984 hit "Lobo Hombre en París". According to their website, Rafa Sánchez also left in 2020 after Mario Martinez in 2015 due to health problems, (reportedly larynx cancer) leaving Luis Bolín at the helm.

History 

La Unión sold more than 2 million copies, and received a diamond disc in 2006. They have also won many platinum records.

Discography
 Mil siluetas (1984)
 El maldito viento (1985)
 4×4 (1987)
 Vivir al este del Edén (1988)
 Tentación (1990)
 Tren de largo recorrido (1992)
 Psychofunkster au lait (1993)
 Los maxis (1993)
 Conmemorativo 1984-1994 (1994)
 Hiperespacio (1996)
 Fluye (1997)
 La Unión (1999)
 Grandes éxitos (Recopilatorio) (2000)
 El mar de la fertilidad (2002)
 Colección audiovisual 1984-2004 (Recopilatorio) (2004)
 Love Sessions (Recopilatorio electrónico) (2006)
 Big Bang (2010)
 Hip.gnosis (2013)
 Grandes Éxitos by Hip.Gnosis (2013)
 Hip.gnosis Best of Vol.2 (2015)
 Todo Éxitos (2015)
 No Estamos Solos En Concierto (2017)

References

External links
 Website
 

Spanish new wave musical groups
Musical groups established in 1982